Pimple Hill is a summit in Monroe County, Pennsylvania, United States, with an elevation of .

A surveyors' station of the U.S. National Geodetic Survey was located atop Pimple Hill.

References

Landforms of Monroe County, Pennsylvania
Mountains of Pennsylvania